Svend Nielsen (20 November 1928 – 25 May 2005) was a Danish footballer who competed in the 1952 Summer Olympics. He also played in ten matches for the Denmark national football team from 1950 to 1952.

References

1928 births
2005 deaths
Association football defenders
Danish men's footballers
Olympic footballers of Denmark
Footballers at the 1952 Summer Olympics
Boldklubben af 1893 players